Madison Correctional Institution is a state prison for men in Madison, Madison County, Florida, owned and operated by the Florida Department of Corrections.  The facility houses a maximum of 1189 inmates at a mix of security levels.  

The death of inmate Justin Campos on October 1, 2013, raised questions about safety in the facility.  After Campos was killed by another inmate, officials offered his family contradictory versions of his whereabouts at the time, withheld basic information from his mother, and sent her invoices for more than $4000 for providing heavily redacted public records she requested.

References

Prisons in Florida
Buildings and structures in Madison County, Florida
1989 establishments in Florida